Vadim Mitryakov (born April 18, 1991) is a Russian professional ice hockey forward who currently plays for Metallurg Novokuznetsk of the Kontinental Hockey League (KHL).

Mitryakov made his Kontinental Hockey League debut playing with Metallurg Novokuznetsk during the 2010–11 KHL season.

References

External links

1991 births
Living people
Beibarys Atyrau players
Kuznetskie Medvedi players
Metallurg Novokuznetsk players
People from Novokuznetsk
Russian ice hockey forwards
Universiade medalists in ice hockey
Universiade bronze medalists for Russia
Competitors at the 2013 Winter Universiade
Sportspeople from Kemerovo Oblast